The Hsinchu County Government is the local government of the Republic of China that governs Hsinchu County.

Organization 
 Civil Affairs Department
 Finance Department
 International Economic Development Department
 Public Works Department
 Education Department
 Agriculture Department
 Social Affairs Department
 Labor Affairs Department
 Land Administration Department
 Transportation and Tourism Department
 General Development Department
 Administration of Indigenous Peoples Affairs
 Personnel Department
 Civil Service Ethics Department
 Budget, Accounting and Statistics Department

Transportation 
The building is accessible within walking distance south of Zhubei Station of Taiwan Railways.

See also 
 Hsinchu County Council

References

External links

 

Hsinchu County
Local governments of the Republic of China